In parliamentary systems, politicians are said to cross the floor if they formally change their political affiliation to a different political party than which they were initially elected under (as is the case in Canada and the United Kingdom). In Australia though, this term simply refers to Members of Parliament (MPs) who dissent from the party line and vote against the express instructions of the party whip while retaining membership in their political party (at least for the time being).

Voting against party lines may lead to consequences such as losing a position (e.g., as minister or a portfolio critic) or being ejected from the party caucus. While these practices are legally permissible in most countries, crossing the floor can lead to controversy and media attention. Some countries like India, the Maldives and Bangladesh have laws that remove a member from parliament due to floor-crossing.

Etymology
The term originates from the British House of Commons, which is configured with the Government and Opposition facing each other on rows of benches. In consequence, MPs who switch from the governing party to one in opposition (or vice versa) also change which side of the chamber on which they sit. A notable example of this is Winston Churchill, who crossed the floor from the Conservatives to the Liberals in 1904, later crossing back in 1924. The term has passed into general use in other Westminster parliamentary democracies even if many of these countries have semicircular or horseshoe-shaped debating chambers.

The Australia meaning on the other hand arises from the way divisions — roll call votes — are conducted. In Australian chambers, members move to the government benches (on the presiding officer's right) to vote in favor of a motion, and the opposition benches (on the presiding officer's left) to vote against a motion. Therefore, an MP who crosses the floor is on the opposite side of the chamber from the rest of their party, and on government motions frequently on the opposite side of the chamber than they normally sit.

In Nigeria, the term "crossing the carpet" or "carpet crossing" is used. In India, a similar expression is "Aaya Ram Gaya Ram", referring to political floor-crossing.

Changing parties 
In the United Kingdom and Canada, crossing the floor means leaving one's party entirely and joining another caucus. For example, leaving an opposition party to support the government (or vice versa), leaving or being expelled from the party one ran with at election and sitting as a clear independent, or even leaving one opposition party to join another. In both countries, the term carries only this meaning, not simply voting against the party line on a bill.

In April 2006, then-premier of Manitoba Gary Doer of the New Democratic Party of Manitoba proposed banning crossing the floor in the Manitoba legislature in response to "the concern some voters have expressed over the high-profile defections of three federal MPs from their parties in just over two years". The resulting legislation, which amended the provincial Legislative Assembly Act, mandated that members of the legislature who quit (or are expelled from) their political party had to serve out the remainder of their term as independents.  However in 2018, the Progressive Conservative government of Brian Pallister repealed the bill.

An extraordinary example occurred in Alberta, Canada, in December 2014 by Danielle Smith, the Leader of the Official Opposition. She and eight of her MLAs, all of the Wildrose Party, crossed the floor together to join the governing Progressive Conservative Association of Alberta. In 2019, eleven British MPs defected from the Conservative and Labour parties to form the Change UK party. In September 2019, the governing Conservative party lost its working majority when Phillip Lee MP defected to the Liberal Democrats during the first speech of new prime minister Boris Johnson. On 19 January 2022, Christian Wakeford, Conservative MP for Bury South, crossed the floor to the Labour benches.

Voting against party lines
In some countries, the phrase "crossing the floor" describes members of a government party or parties who defect by voting with the opposition against some piece of government-sponsored legislation. Political parties commonly allow their members a free vote on some matters of personal conscience. In Australia, one of the major parties, the Australian Labor Party requires its members to pledge their support for the collective decisions of the caucus, which theoretically prohibits them from "crossing the floor" in this sense; however, in practice, some Labor members disregard this pledge, despite the disciplinary action which may result. Among other parties, crossing the floor is rare, although then Senator Barnaby Joyce of the National Party of Australia crossed the floor 19 times under the Howard coalition government. Tasmanian Senator Sir Reg Wright, voted against his own party, the Liberal Party of Australia, on 150 occasions, which has been claimed as a record for this form of crossing the floor in the Australian Parliament.

See also
Aaya Ram Gaya Ram, a term used in India for party-switching politicians
Aisle (political term)
Conscience vote
Crossover voting
Floor crossing (South Africa)
List of British politicians who have crossed the floor
List of Canadian politicians who have crossed the floor
List of United States representatives who switched parties
List of United States senators who switched parties
Party switching for a similar concept
Trasformismo for a similar concept in Italy
Waka-jumping
Whip (politics), in UK politics voting against the party line is known as "defying the whip"
Party discipline

Notes

References

Politics
Westminster system
Party switching